The United States special envoy for Haiti is a diplomatic position within the United States Department of State created after the assassination of Jovenel Moïse. The special envoy coordinates efforts between  Haiti and the United States to promote peace and stability in the country.

The inaugural special envoy was Daniel Lewis Foote, who served from July to September 2021. Foote resigned following frustrations that his "recommendations [had] been ignored and dismissed". 

In August 2022, four members of Congress called on President Biden to name a new special envoy.

References 

 
Haiti–United States relations